Caught Up may refer to:
Caught Up (Millie Jackson album), 1974 Millie Jackson album
Caught Up (film), 1998 Darin Scott film
Caught Up (soundtrack), the soundtrack to the 1998 crime film
"Caught Up" (Usher song), 2004 Usher song
"Caught Up" (Ja Rule song), 2004 Ja Rule song
 "Caught Up", a 2013 song by John Legend from Love in the Future
 "Caught Up", a song by Snoop Doggy Dogg from Death Row: The Lost Sessions Vol. 1